Henry atte Stone may refer to:

Henry atte Stone I, MP for Bletchingley in 1388
Henry atte Stone II, MP for Bletchingley in 1422

See also
Henry Stone (disambiguation)